Ophthalmoglipa is a genus of beetles in the family Mordellidae, containing the following species:

 Ophthalmoglipa aurocaudata (Fairmaire, 1897)
 Ophthalmoglipa australis Franciscolo, 1952
 Ophthalmoglipa bilyi Horák, 1998
 Ophthalmoglipa iriana Horák, 1998
 Ophthalmoglipa maranoelai Horák, 1998

References

Mordellidae